Igdabatis is a prehistoric genus of ray whose fossils are found in rocks dating from the Maastrichtian stage of Spain (Figuerola and La Maçana Formations of the Fontllonga Group), the Dukamaje Formation of Niger and the Takli, Lameta, Fatehgarh and Intertrappean Beds Formations of India.

Classification

Species
Three species of Igdabatis are known from the Cretaceous of Spain, Niger, and India.
 Igdabatis sigmodon
 Igdabatis indicus
 Igdabatis marmii

See also
 Flora and fauna of the Maastrichtian stage
 List of prehistoric cartilaginous fish (Chondrichthyes)

References

Prehistoric cartilaginous fish genera
Cretaceous cartilaginous fish
Rajiformes
Late Cretaceous fish of Asia
Cretaceous fish of Europe